Renco Posinković (January 4, 1964) is a former Yugoslav and Croatian water polo water polo player and coach. He was part of the Yugoslavia team which won the gold medal in water polo in the 1988 Summer Olympics.

See also
 Yugoslavia men's Olympic water polo team records and statistics
 List of Olympic champions in men's water polo
 List of Olympic medalists in water polo (men)
 List of men's Olympic water polo tournament goalkeepers
 List of world champions in men's water polo
 List of World Aquatics Championships medalists in water polo

References

External links
 

1964 births
Living people
Water polo players from Split, Croatia
Croatian male water polo players
Yugoslav male water polo players
Water polo goalkeepers
Olympic water polo players of Yugoslavia
Olympic gold medalists for Yugoslavia
Water polo players at the 1988 Summer Olympics
Olympic medalists in water polo
Medalists at the 1988 Summer Olympics
Croatian water polo coaches